Operation Long John was an operation undertaken by the Selous Scouts of the Rhodesian Army on 25 June 1976 against two ZANLA guerrilla bases located in Mozambique near Mapai. Operation Long John was an attack on a guerrilla transit camp at Mapai and staging post identified as Chicualacuala. 

The plan of the operations would involve the first use of a tactic by the Rhodesian Security Forces that would become known as the "Flying-Column Attack". The transit camp was located approximately 60 kilometres inside Mozambique. 

It was necessary to introduce a reconnaissance force into the area in order to determine the exact location and size of the camp. It was confirmed that approximately 90 ZANLA insurgents were staged at Chicualacuala, and a large ZANLA arsenal was located at Mapai. The confirmation of an arsenal" meant that the attacking force would come in contact with FRELIMO soldiers of Mozambique. 

The new government of Mozambique was willing to provide sanctuary for the Patriotic Front insurgents, but they would not allow them to travel throughout the countryside in armed groups. Their weapons were maintained and guarded by FRELIMO soldiers, and issued immediately prior to their infiltration into Rhodesia.

The plan involved a mechanised assault across the border utilising armoured cars, trucks, and several buses. The attack would bypass Chicualacuala, and strike directly at Mapai. The former would be eliminated on the return trip.

References

Bibliography

1976 in Rhodesia
Long John
1976 in Mozambique
Mozambique–Rhodesia relations